Lara can be a given name or a surname in several languages. It can be used as a short form of the name Larissa or derived from the Latin word lūcēre, meaning "to shine".

Given name

 Lara Abdallat (born 1982), Jordanian hacker
 Lara Aharonian (born 1972), Armenian Canadian human rights activist
 Lara Aknin, Canadian social psychologist 
 Lara Alcock, British mathematics educator
 Lara Amersey (born 1984), Canadian actress
 Lara Arruabarrena (born 1992), Spanish tennis player
 Lara-B (born 1979), Slovenian singer
 Lara Baars (born 1996), Dutch athlete
 Lara Bahlawan (born 1994), Lebanese footballer
 Lara Baladi (born 1969), Egyptian-Lebanese photographer
 Lara Barbieri (born 1986), Italian football player
 Lara Belmont (born 1980), English actress
 Lara Berman (born 1980), Israeli correspondent
 Lara Bianconi (born 1974), Italian swimmer
 Lara Bitter (born 1975), Dutch tennis player
 Lara Larramendi Blakely, American mayor
 Lara Bloom (born 1980), patient expert and advocate
 Lara Flynn Boyle (born 1970), American actress
 Lara Breay, British film producer
 Lara Briden (born 1969), author
 Lara Brown, American political scientist
 Lara Butler (born 1994), Caymanian swimmer
 Lara Cardella (born 1969), Italian writer
 Lara Carroll (born 1986), English swimmer
 Lara Casanova (born 1996), Swiss snowboarder
 Lara Cazalet (born 1973), English actress
 Lara Habib Chamat (born 1980), Lebanese news presenter
 Lara Jean Chorostecki (born 1984), Canadian actress
 Lara Christen (born 2002), Swiss ice hockey player
 Lara Cody (born 1957), American voice actress
 Lara Petusky Coger (born 1970), American journalist
 Lara Comi (born 1983), Italian politician
 Lara Cox (born 1978), Australian actress
 Lara Custance (born 1992), New Zealand actress
 Lara Davenport (born 1983), Australian Olympic athlete
 Lara Hedberg Deam (born 1967), American publisher
 Lara Debbana (born 1994), Egyptian model
 Lara Defour (born 1997), Belgian professional racing cyclist
 Lara Denis (born 1969), American philosopher
 Lara Dickenmann (born 1985), Swiss footballer
 Lara Elena Donnelly (born 1990), American author
 Lara Dunkley (born 1995), Australian netball player
 Lara Dutta (born 1978), Indian actress
 Lara Escauriza (born 1998), Paraguayan tennis player
 Lara Escudero (born 1993), French ice hockey player
 Lara Fabian (born 1970), Belgian-Canadian singer
 Lara Falk (born 1997), Australian skier
 Lara Favaretto (born 1973), Italian artist
 Lara Fernandez (born 1996), Spanish kickboxer
 Lara Filocamo (born 1990), Australian rules footballer
 Lara George, Nigerian artist
 Lara Giddings (born 1972), Australian politician
 Lara Gilchrist (born 1982), Canadian actress
 Lara Gillespie (born 2001), Irish professional racing cyclist
 Lara Goodall (born 1996), South African cricketer
 Lara Goodison (born 1989), English actress
 Lara González (rhythmic gymnast) (born 1986), Spanish rhythmic gymnast
 Lara Grangeon (born 1991), French swimmer
 Lara Grice (born 1971), American actress
 Lara Gut-Behrami (born 1991), Swiss alpine ski racer
 Lara Naki Gutmann (born 2002), Italian figure skater
 Lara Harris (born 1962), American model
 Lara Heinz (born 1981), Luxembourgian swimmer
 Lara Hoffmann (born 1991), German Olympic athlete
 Lara Hooiveld (born 1971), Australian swimmer
 Lara Ivanuša (born 1997), Slovenian footballer
 Lara Jackson (born 1986), American freestyle swimmer
 Lara Jakes (born 1973), American journalist
 Lara St. John (born 1971), Canadian violinist
 Lara Johnson-Wheeler (born 1992/93), British arts and fashion journalist
 Lara Jones (1975–2010), British artist
 Lara Käpplein (born 1995), German badminton player
 Lara Keller (born 1991), Swiss football striker
 Lara Knutson (born 1974), American artist
 Lara Kramer, Canadian dancer
 Lara Landon (born 1985), American musician
 Lara Lewington (born 1979), British television presenter
 Lara Logan (born 1971), American television journalist for CBS News
 Lara Magoni (born 1969), Italian alpine skier and politician
 Lara Mahal, American professor   
 Lara Maigue (born 1991), Filipino singer                                      
 Lara Maiklem (born 1971), British author
 Lara Malsiner (born 2000), Italian ski jumper
 Lara Mandić (born 1974), Serbian basketball player
 Lara Maritz (born 2001), Irish cricketer
 Lara Marlowe (born 1967), American journalist
 Lara Jean Marshall (born 1988), Australian-English actress
 Lara Martin, English musician
 Lara Mazur, Canadian film editor
 Lara McAllen (born 1983), British vocalist
 Lara McDonnell (born 2003), Irish actress
 Lara McSpadden (born 1999), Australian basketball player
 Lara Della Mea (born 1999), Italian alpine ski racer
 Lara Melda (born 1993), Turkish pianist
 Lara Merrett (born 1971), Australian visual artist
 Lara Meyerratken, Australian instrumentalist 
 Lara Michel (born 1991), Swiss tennis player
 Lara Jill Miller (born 1967), American actress
 Lara Molins (born 1980), Irish cricketer
 Lara Morgan (born 1967), British entrepreneur
 Lara Mori (born 1998), Italian artistic gymnast
 Lara Mullen (born 1994), British fashion model
 Lara Nielsen (born 1992), Australian athlete
 Lara González Ortega (born 1992), Spanish handball player
 Lara Oviedo (born 1988), Argentine-Italian field hockey player
 Lara Pampín (born 1995), Spanish field hockey player
 Lara Parker (born 1938), American television actress
 Lara Saint Paul (1945–2018), Eritrean-Italian singer
 Lara Pavlović (born 1998), Croatian handball player
 Lara Peake (born 1998), English actress
 Lara Petera (born 1978), New Zealand professional squash player
 Lara Peyrot (born 1975), Italian cross-country skier
 Lara Pitt (born 1981), Australian television presenter
 Lara Porzak (born 1967), American fine art photographer
 Lara Prašnikar (born 1998), Slovenian striker
 Lara Preacco (born 1971), Swiss swimmer
 Lara Prescott, American author
 Lara Prior-Palmer (born 1994), British writer and athlete
 Lara Pulver (born 1980), English actress
 Lara Rabal (born 1983), Spanish football player
 Lara Rae (born 1963), Canadian comedian
 Lara Jo Regan (born 1962), American photographer
 Lara-Isabelle Rentinck (born 1986), German film actress
 Lara Robinson (born 1998), Australian actress
 Lara Rodrigues (born 1990), Brazilian actress
 Lara Rose, British singer
 Lara Rossi, British actress
 Lara Roxx (born 1982), Canadian pornographic film actress
 Lara van Ruijven (1992–2020), Dutch short track speed skater
 Lara Juliette Sanders, German director
 Lara Sanders (born 1986), American-Turkish basketball player
 Lara Mussell Savage, English athlete
 Lara Scandar (born 1990), Egyptian singer-songwriter
 Lara Schmidt (born 1999), German tennis player
 Lara Schnitger (born 1969), American-Dutch painter
 Lara M. Schwartz (born 1970), American music video director
 Lara Setrakian (born 1982), American journalist
 Lara Spencer (born 1969), American television presenter
 Lara Stalder (born 1994), Swiss ice hockey player
 Lara Stein (born 1966), American executive
 Lara Stephen (born 1992), Welsh beauty pageant titleholder
 Lara Stock (born 1992), Croatian chess player
 Lara Stone (born 1983), Dutch fashion model
 Lara Sullivan (born 1969), Australian judoka
 Lara Teeter (born 1955), American dancer
 Lara Teixeira (born 1987), Brazilian Olympic athlete
 Lara Trump (born 1982), American television producer
 Lara Vadlau (born 1994), Austrian sailor
 Lara Vapnyar (born 1971), American author
 Lara Veronin (born 1988), Taiwanese singer
 Lara Vieceli (born 1993), Italian racing cyclist
 Lara Villata (born 1967), Italian equestrian 
 Lara Vukasović (born 1994), Croatian volleyball player
 Lara Wendel (born 1965), German actress
 Lara de Wit (born 1983), Australian pianist
 Lara Wolf (born 2000), Austrian freestyle skier
 Lara Wollington (born 2003), British actress
 Lara Wolters (born 1986), Dutch politician
 Lara Worthington (born 1987), Australian model
 Lara Yan (born 1991), Georgian model
 Lara Zara (born 1982), Assyrian politician

Surname

Cultural origins
The Spanish surname Lara is derived from Lara de los Infantes, in the Burgos province of Spain, and in some cases retains the original form, de Lara ('of Lara'); there are also Lara surnames in France and Romania.

People with the surname
 Adelina de Lara (1872–1961), British pianist and composer
 Adriana Lara, Mexican computer scientist
 Agustín Lara (1900–1970), Mexican composer
 Alda Lara, poet
 Alexandra Maria Lara, Romanian actress
 Alonso Manrique de Lara, Roman Catholic bishop
 Antonio Lara de Gavilán, Spanish artist
 Antonio Lara Zárate (1881–1956), Spanish lawyer and politician
 Bernardo Gutiérrez de Lara, politician
 Blanca de La Cerda y Lara, Spanish noblewoman
 Brian Lara (born 1969), Trinidadian cricketer
 Brigido Lara, Mexican artist
 Carlos Lara Bareiro, Paraguayan composer
 Catherine Lara, French violinist, composer and singer
 Cayo Lara (born 1952), Spanish politician 
 Christian Lara, Ecuadorian footballer
 Christian Lara, Guadeloupean film director
 Claude Autant-Lara, French film director
 Daniel Lara, subject of the 2016 Damn Daniel internet meme
 Daniel García Lara, football striker
 David Laurent de Lara (c.1806–1876), illuminator
 Dona Ivone Lara (1922 – 2018), Brazilian singer and composer
 Eduardo Lara, Colombian football manager
 Emilio Lara (weightlifter), Cuban weightlifter
 Erislandy Lara, Cuban boxer
 Eurico Lara (1897–1935), Brazilian footballer
 Francisco José Lara, Spanish professional road bicycle racer
 Georgia Lara, Greek water polo player
 Guillermo Lara, politician
 Isidore de Lara, English composer
 Jacinto Lara (1777–1859), Venezuelan independence leader
 Jami Porter Lara, American artist
 Jerónimo Manrique de Lara, General Inquisitor
 Joe Lara, American actor and musician
 José Manuel Lara, Spanish golfer
 Juan Lara, baseball player
 Juan Jesús Vivas Lara, Spanish politician
 Joaquin Gallegos Lara, Ecuadorian writer and poet
 Kiki Lara, Mexican soccer player
 Louis, comte de Narbonne-Lara, French soldier and diplomat
 Lucas Martínez Lara, Roman Catholic bishop
 Lúcio Lara, former General Secretary of the MPLA
 Luisa María Lara (born 1966), Spanish astrophysicist
 María Teresa Lara, a Mexican composer 
 Maritza Lara-López, Mexican astronomer
 Martha Lara (fl. late 20th century), Mexican diplomat & politician
 Martín Acosta y Lara, Uruguayan basketball player
 Modesto Lara (born 1973), Dominican Republic judoka
 Nil Lara, American musician
 Oruno Lara, Guadeloupean poet, author and historian
 Osvaldo Lara (born 1955), Cuban track and field sprinter
 Pablo Lara, Cuban weightlifter
 Rafael Paulo de Lara Araújo, Brazilian basketball player
 Raúl Lara, soccer player
 Ricardo Lara, California politician
 Rocío Lara, Muppeteer
 Rodrigo Lara Bonilla, Colombian politician
 Rosalio José Castillo Lara, Roman Catholic cardinal
 Saúl Lara, Bolivian politician
 Tino de Lara, Filipino actor
 Tito Lara, Puerto Rican singer
 Willian Lara (1957–2010), Venezuelan politician
 Víctor Neumann-Lara, Mexican mathematician
 Marlon Guillermo Lara Orellana, politician
 Margrét Lára Viðarsdóttir, Icelandic footballer

Fictional characters with the name
 Lara (comics), the biological mother of the comic book character Superman
  Larissa "Lara" Antipova, heroine of Boris Pasternak's novel Doctor Zhivago (1957, played by Julie Christie in the 1965 film)
 Lara Božić, titular character of the Croatian television series Larin izbor (Lara's Choice)
 Lara Croft, main character from the Tomb Raider series
 Lara-Su, Knuckle's future daughter from the Sonic the Hedgehog comic series. She appears in the "Mobius 25 Years Later" storyline and in its sequel arc: "30 Years Later". Lara-Su is also the main protagonist in the upcoming Lara-Su Chronicles graphic novel series.
 Lara the Black Cat Fairy, a character in Rainbow Magic

Mythological characters with the name
 Lara (mythology), in Greek mythology, Lara is a Naiad nymph and daughter of the river Almo in Ovid's poem Fasti
 Lara, in ancient Egyptian mythology, means sun ray, coming from Ra, the god of sun.

References

See also
Lara (disambiguation)

English feminine given names
Arabic feminine given names
Spanish feminine given names
Italian feminine given names
Turkish feminine given names
Croatian feminine given names
Slovene feminine given names
German feminine given names
Filipino feminine given names